These are the rosters of all participating teams at the women's water polo tournament at the 2015 World Aquatics Championships in Kazan, Russia.

Group A

Jessica Gaudreault
Krystina Alogbo
Katrina Monton
Emma Wright
Monika Eggens
Kelly McKee
Joëlle Békhazi
Shae Fournier
Carmen Eggens
Christine Robinson
Stephanie Valin
Dominique Perreault
Nicola Colterjohn

Alexandra Zharkimbayeva
Aruzhan Yegemberdiyeva
Aizhan Akilbayeva
Anna Turova
Kamila Zakirova
Oxana Tikhonova
Zamira Myrzabekova
Oxana Saichuk
Darya Muravyeva
Darya Roga
Anastassiya Mirshina
Assem Mussarova
Darya Ryzhinskaya

Brooke Millar
Nicole Lewis
Sarah Pattison
Danielle Lewis
Simone Lewis
Sarah Landry
Miranda Chase
Caitlin Lopes Da Silva
Emma Stoneman
Liana Dance
Kirsten Hudson
Jasmine Myles
Katherine Curnow

Laura Ester
Marta Bach
Anni Espar
Paula Leitón
Matilde Ortiz
Jennifer Pareja
Clara Espar
Pilar Peña
Judith Forca
Roser Tarragó
Maica García
Laura López
Patricia Herrera

Group B

Lea Yanitsas
Gemma Beadsworth
Hannah Buckling
Holly Lincoln-Smith
Keesja Gofers
Bronwen Knox
Rowie Webster
Glennie McGhie
Zoe Arancini
Ash Southern
Bronte Halligan
Nicola Zagame
Kelsey Wakefield

Eleni Kouvdou
Christina Tsoukala
Stephania Haralabidis
Christina Kotsia
Margarita Plevritou
Alkisti Avramidou
Alexandra Asimaki
Antigoni Roumpesi
Ioanna Haralabidis
Triantafyllia Manolioudaki
Eleftheria Plevritou
Eleni Xenaki
Chrysoula Diamantopoulou

Laura Aarts
Yasemin Smit
Dagmar Genee
Sabrina van der Sloot
Amarens Genee
Nomi Stomphorst
Marloes Nijhuis
Vivian Sevenich
Maud Megens
Isabella van Toorn
Lieke Klaassen
Leonie van der Molen
Debby Willemsz

Rebecca Thomas
Megan Parkes
Kieren Paley
Ruby Versfeld
Megan Schooling
Amica Hallendorff
Kimberly Kay
Delaine Christien
Lindsay Killeen
Deborah O'Hanlon
Kelsey White
Alexandre Gaiscoigne

Group C

Tess Oliveira
Diana Abla
Marina Zablith
Mariana Duarte
Lucianne Barroncas
Izabella Chiappini
Amanda Oliveira
Luiza Carvalho
Melani Dias
Viviane Bahia
Lorena Borges
Gabriela Mantellato
Victória Chamorro

Giulia Gorlero
Chiara Tabani
Arianna Garibotti
Elisa Queirolo
Federica Radicchi
Rosaria Aiello
Tania Di Mario
Roberta Bianconi
Giulia Emmolo
Francesca Pomeri
Laura Barzon
Teresa Frassinetti
Laura Teani

Team roster

Rikako Miura
Chiaki Sakanoue
Yuri Kazama
Shino Magariyama
Moe Nakata
Ayaka Takahashi
Yumi Nakano
Mitsuki Hashiguchi
Kana Hosoya
Tsubasa Mori
Marina Tokumoto
Kotori Suzuki
Yuko Umeda

Samantha Hill
Madeline Musselmann
Melissa Seidemann
Rachel Fattal
Alys Williams
Margaret Steffens
Courtney Mathewson
Kiley Neushul
Ashley Grossman
Kaleigh Gilchrist
Makenzie Fischer
Kami Craig
Ashleigh Johnson

Group D

Yang Jun
Tian Jianing
Mei Xiaohan
Xiong Dunhan
Niu Guannan
Sun Yating
Song Donglun
Zhang Cong
Zhao Zihan
Zhang Weiwei
Wang Xinyan
Zhang Jing
Peng Lin

Lorène Derenty
Estelle Millot
Léa Bachelier
Aurore Sacré
Louise Guillet
Géraldine Mahieu
Marie Barbieux
Marion Tardy
Lucie Cesca
Sonia Bouloukbachi
Yaëlle Deschampt
Michaela Jaskova
Morgane Chabrier

Flóra Bolonyai
Dóra Czigány
Dóra Antal
Dóra Kisteleki
Gabriella Szűcs
Orsolya Takács
Anna Illés
Rita Keszthelyi
Ildikó Tóth
Barbara Bujka
Krisztina Garda
Katalin Menczinger
Edina Gangl

Anastasia Verkhoglyadova
Tatiana Zubkova
Ekaterina Prokofyeva
Elvina Karimova
Ekaterina Zubacheva
Anastasia Simanovich
Ekaterina Lisunova
Evgeniia Abdriziakova
Anna Timofeeva
Ekaterina Tankeeva
Evgeniya Ivanova
Nadezhda Iarondaikina
Anna Karnaukh

See also
Water polo at the 2015 World Aquatics Championships – Men's team rosters

References

External links
Official website
Records and statistics (reports by Omega)

World Aquatics Championships water polo squads
Women's team rosters
2015 in women's water polo